The Lost Lemon Mine is a legendary lost mine said to be located in the southwest of the Canadian province of Alberta.  The story has been retold in countless books with the authoritative version being The Lost Lemon Mine by Tom Primrose. The story first appeared in  the 1946 edition of the Alberta Folklore Quarterly and later in magazines such as Canada West.  The Lost Lemon Mine has also been featured in the television documentary series Northern Mysteries and worked into the plot of The Final Sacrifice.  Countless people have searched for the mine.  A number of searchers have never returned.

References

Lost mines
Gold mines in Canada
Canadian folklore
Mines in Alberta